No Game was a popular band from Curaçao. The group exist of several vocalists, including Reinier Lijfrock, who has been crowned to Tumba-king, and drummers.

Discography
2005 - Kurason óf Kónsenshi

References

Curaçao musicians